Kasinski, was a Brazilian manufacturer of two- and three-wheeled vehicles, such as motorcycles, scooters and mopeds. It was established in 1999 by Abraham Kasinsky and sold in 2009 to the CR Zongshen group, a Sino-Brazilian group controlled by Zongshen.

History 
The company was started with the purchase of the industrial facilities of the Korean assembler Hyosung, an operation that included the rights to continue manufacturing its line of motorcycles, under the brand name Kasinski. In parallel with the motorcycles, the company would also assemble cargo tricycles with technology from India's Bajaj Auto.

In 2002 with a range of ten motorcycle models, with an average nationalization index of 65%. Despite good sales, production did not grow beyond 600 units per month. The tricycles that were initially expected to produce 1,500 units a month never became a reality, sales remained at unsatisfactory levels, and by 2007 the vehicles were no longer being produced.

Abraham Kasinsky sold the company, passing it on in July 2009. In 2010 the company announced the construction of a new factory in Sapucaia, Rio de Janeiro, where it would produce electric motorcycles. Amidst legal and labor problems, production was suspended in 2013. Since 2014 Kasinski no longer operates in Brazil.

Past models 

 Sportbikes Comet
 Comet GT650R 
 Comet GT250R 
 Standards Comet
 Comet GT650
 Comet GT250
 Comet GT150
 Standards
 Flash
 Seta
Cruisers
 Mirage
 Mirage Premier 
 Mirage Power
Scooters
 Soft
 Supercab
 Prima
 Win 
 Off-road bikes
 CRZ 
 Auto rickshaw
 Motokar

References

External links
 Lexicar website
 Moto website

Manufacturing companies based in São Paulo
1999 establishments in Brazil
2014 disestablishments in Brazil
Brazilian brands
Brazilian subsidiaries of foreign companies
Defunct motorcycle manufacturers of Brazil
Defunct motor vehicle manufacturers of Brazil
Manaus
Scooter manufacturers
Vehicle manufacturing companies established in 1999
Vehicle manufacturing companies disestablished in 2014